This is a list of all cricketers who have played first-class or List A cricket for Karachi Port Trust cricket team. The team played ten first-class matches and ten List A matches between 2003 and 2005. Seasons given are first and last seasons; the player did not necessarily play in all the intervening seasons.

Players
 Aariz Kamal, 2002/03-2005/06
 Adeel Malik, 2003/04-2004/05
 Ahmer Saeed, 2004/05
 Ali Zafar, 2003/04
 Atif Ali, 2002/03-2004/05
 Fahad Iqbal, 2004/05
 Fahad Khan, 2002/03-2004/05
 Fahadullah Khan, 2002/03-2004/05
 Faisal Mirza, 2002/03-2003/04
 Farhan Iqbal, 2003/04
 Haaris Ayaz, 2003/04
 Ibrahim Qureshi, 2004/05
 Iqbal Sheikh, 2002/03-2004/05
 Javed Qadeer, 2004/05
 Maisam Hasnain, 2002/03-2004/05
 Mansoor Ahmed, 2004/05
 Mohammad Farrukh, 2003/04
 Mohammad Hasnain, 2003/04-2004/05
 Nadeem Javed, 2004/05
 Rashid Hanif, 2003/04-2004/05
 Raza Ali Dar, 2003/04-2004/05
 Saad Wasim, 2004/05
 Shadab Kabir, 2003/04-2004/05
 Shahid Iqbal, 2003/04
 Shahid Khan, 2004/05
 Wahab Riaz, 2003/04
 Wajihuddin, 2003/04

References

Karachi Port Trust cricketers